Liu Shen-liang (born 18 March 1939) is a Taiwanese politician. A member of the Kuomintang, Liu served on the Legislative Yuan from 1990 to 1993, between 1996 and 2002, and again from 2005 to 2012.

Education
Liu earned a bachelor's degree from Tatung University, and also studied at Tamkang University.

Political career
Liu served on the Taipei County Council from 1977 to 1990. He was then elected to three separate stints on the Legislative Yuan, covering five terms.

Personal
His daughter is married to Johnny Chiang.

References

1939 births
New Taipei Members of the Legislative Yuan
Tamkang University alumni
Tatung University alumni
Kuomintang Members of the Legislative Yuan in Taiwan
Members of the 1st Legislative Yuan in Taiwan
Members of the 3rd Legislative Yuan
Taiwanese politicians of Hakka descent
Members of the 4th Legislative Yuan
Members of the 6th Legislative Yuan
Members of the 7th Legislative Yuan
Party List Members of the Legislative Yuan
Living people
New Taipei City Councilors